The Washington Diplomats were an American soccer club representing Washington, D.C. Throughout their playing existence, the club played their home games at Robert F. Kennedy Memorial Stadium and indoor home matches at the neighboring D.C. Armory. Founded as an expansion franchise in 1974, the Diplomats competed in the now-defunct North American Soccer League, then the top-tier soccer league of the American soccer pyramid.

Plagued with mediocrity in their first few seasons of existence, the Diplomats did not qualify for the playoffs until 1976, their third year in the league. The Diplomats were knocked out by the New York Cosmos in the first round. That season, the club played their home matches in Northern Virginia at W.T. Woodson High School, before going back to RFK Stadium in 1977. During the next three seasons, the Diplomats achieved more regular season success and reached the postseason every year from 1978 until 1980. Consequently, the club experienced a spike in average attendance, nearing 20,000 fans a game by the 1980 season, although a significant number of tickets were "comps" or "papered" by the teams' front office staff.

Following the end of the 1980 season, the original Diplomats club folded when then owner, the Madison Square Garden Corp., had accumulated losses of $6 million and team president Steve Danzansky could not gather enough money to keep the team alive. However, that same season the Detroit Express NASL franchise relocated to the Washington metropolitan area, renaming themselves the "Diplomats" due to perceived familiarity of the moniker to the area. However, a regression of attendance and a lack of field success sounded the death knell of the franchise, and the Diplomats folded following the 1981 season.

History

Before the Dips

The Washington Whips were a soccer team based in Washington, D.C. that played in the United Soccer Association. The league was made up of teams imported from foreign leagues. The Washington club was actually Aberdeen F.C. from Scotland.

Following the 1967 season, the USA merged with the National Professional Soccer League to form the North American Soccer League with the teams from the former USA having to create their rosters from scratch. Their home field was RFK Stadium. The team's owner was Earl Foreman, later owner of the Virginia Squires of the American Basketball Association and commissioner of the original Major Indoor Soccer League. Edward T. Reynolds was the booth announcer for the club prior to the merger.

Original NASL franchise
The original  Washington Diplomats first came into being when in 1974 when the North American Soccer League (NASL) granted a franchise to a Washington, D.C. based business group. The team played all their home games at RFK Stadium in 1974, but in 1975 and 1976 they played most of their games at W.T. Woodson High School in Northern Virginia, including all of their 1976 games. They played indoor home matches at the neighboring D.C. Armory. After a lackluster beginning to the franchise, the Diplomats qualified for the playoffs and increased average game attendance in each of their last three years of existence. Additionally, in their final year, the Diplomats were able to sign the future European Player of the Century Johan Cruyff. After the 1980 season the Diplomats folded when then owner, the Madison Square Garden Corp., had accumulated losses of $6 million and team president Steve Danzansky could not gather enough money to keep the team alive.

The cheerleaders for the original Diplomats were known as the Honeydips until 1980 when their name was changed to the Sidekicks.  The team also ran ad campaigns calling themselves "the Dips."

Express relocate to Washington
After the original Diplomats folded following the 1980 season, the Detroit Express moved to Washington to become the new Diplomats. This team only lasted for one season.

Rivalries
The Diplomats' greatest rivalry was with the New York Cosmos. This was especially true when Johan Cruyff was playing in DC and the Cosmos had Pele, Beckenbauer and Giorgio Chinaglia. When the Cosmos came to RFK the stadium was close to capacity even though the Diplomats usually lost. However, they were always competitive games.

Year-by-year

Players

A number of high-profile soccer players lined out for the Washington Diplomats. Arguably the most famous were the Dutch pair of Johan Cruyff and Wim Jansen who had over 100 caps for the Netherlands between them and who represented the Dips between 1979 and 1981. Other international footballers to play for Washington included Tommy McConville who was capped 6 times by Ireland and Windsor del Llano who played 30 times for Bolivia. Future Real Madrid and Netherlands coach, Guus Hiddink also played for the Diplomats.

Coaches
 Dennis Viollet (1974-1977)
 Gordon Bradley (1978–81)
 Ken Furphy (1981)

Staff & ownership
 Stephen Danzansky 1975–1978
 Sonny Werblin 1979–1980
 Jimmy Hill & Duncan Hill 1981

Relaunch
In 2022 English soccer agent and entrepreneur Scott Michaels registered the clubs trademarks with the United States Patent and Trademark Office and plans to relaunch the team in the National Soccer League

Average attendance per game
1974: 4,975
1975: 8,847
1976: 5,963
1977: 13,037
1978: 10,783
1979: 11,973
1980: 19,205
1981: 16,106

See also
D.C. United
Team America (NASL)
Washington Darts
Washington Whips
Washington Diplomats (1988–1990)

References

External links
nasljerseys.com, unofficial NASL website includes Diplomats info

 
Defunct indoor soccer clubs in the United States
Defunct soccer clubs in Washington, D.C.
North American Soccer League (1968–1984) teams
1974 establishments in Washington, D.C.
1981 disestablishments in Washington, D.C.
Association football clubs established in 1974
Association football clubs disestablished in 1981